Shah Muhammadi(Urdu: شاہ محمدی) is a Village in Pakistan, located in Chakwal District of Punjab, Pakistan

References

Union councils of Chakwal District
Populated places in Chakwal District